Emir Dost Mohammad Khan Barakzai (23 December 17939 June 1863), nicknamed the Amir-i Kabir, was the founder of the Barakzai dynasty and one of the prominent rulers of Afghanistan during the First Anglo-Afghan War. With the decline of the Durrani dynasty, he became the Emir of Afghanistan in 1826. He was the 11th son of Payendah Khan, chief of the Barakzai Pashtuns, who was killed in 1799 by King Zaman Shah Durrani.

At the beginning of his rule, the Afghans lost their former stronghold of Peshawar Valley in March 1823 to the Sikh Khalsa Army of Ranjit Singh at the Battle of Nowshera. The Afghan forces in the battle were led by Azim Khan, half-brother of Dost Mohammad Khan. By the end of his reign, he had reunited the principalities of Kandahar and Herat with Kabul. Dost had ruled for a lengthy 36 years, a span broken only by Zahir Shah more than a century later.

The Musahiban family started with his older brother, Sultan Mohammad Khan, nicknamed "Telai", meaning "golden", a nickname he was given because of his love of fine clothing.

Background and rise to power 
Dost Mohammad Khan was born to an influential family on 23 December 1793 in Kandahar, Durrani Empire. His father, Payinda Khan, was chief of the Barakzai Tribe and a civil servant in the Durrani dynasty. Their family can be traced back to Abdal (the first and founder of the Abdali tribe), through Hajji Jamal Khan, Yousef, Yaru, Mohammad, Omar Khan, Khisar Khan, Ismail, Nek, Daru, Saifal, and Barak. Abdal had Four sons, Popal, Barak, Achak, and Alako. Dost Mohmmad Khan's mother belonged to the Qizilbash group. Dost Mohammad Khan spoke Persian, Pashto, Punjabi and Turkish, but also had knowledge of the Kashmiri language.

His elder brother, the chief of the Barakzai, Fateh Khan, took an important part in raising Mahmud Shah Durrani to the sovereignty of Afghanistan in 1800 and in restoring him to the throne in 1809. Dost Mohammad accompanied his elder brother and then Prime Minister of Kabul Wazir Fateh Khan to the Battle of Attock against the invading Sikhs. Mahmud Shah repaid Fateh Khan's services by having him assassinated in 1818, thus incurring the enmity of his tribe. After a bloody conflict, Mahmud Shah was deprived of all his possessions but Herat, the rest of his dominions being divided among Fateh Khan's brothers. Of these, Dost Mohammad received Ghazni, to which in 1826 he added Kabul, the richest of the Afghan provinces. At the time of his enthronement, his government revenue was about 500,000 rupees, and by the 1830s it had increased to 2.5 million rupees.

From the commencement of his reign he found himself involved in disputes with Ranjit Singh, the Sikh ruler of the Punjab region, who used the dethroned Sadozai prince, Shah Shujah Durrani, as his instrument. In 1834, Shah Shujah made a last attempt to recover his kingdom. He was defeated by Dost Mohammad Khan under the walls of Kandahar, but Ranjit Singh seized the opportunity to annex Peshawar. Dost Mohammad sent his son Akbar Khan to defeat the Sikhs at the Battle of Jamrud in 1837. His failure in recapturing the Jamrud Fort became the Afghan Emir's worst concern.

European influence in Afghanistan 

At the intersection of British, Russian and, to a lesser degree, French imperial interests, political maneuvering was necessary. Rejecting overtures from Russia, he endeavoured to form an alliance with Great Britain, and welcomed Alexander Burnes to Kabul in 1837. Burnes, however, was unable to prevail on the governor-general, Lord Auckland, to respond to the Emir's advances. Dost Mohammad was enjoined to abandon the attempt to recover Peshawar, and to place his foreign policy under British guidance. He replied by renewing his relations with Russia, and in 1838 Lord Auckland set the British troops in motion against him.  To enable such an action, the British manufactured the evidence needed to justify the overthrow of the Afghan ruler.

War with the Sikhs 
In 1835, Dost Mohammad Khan, the youngest and the most energetic of the Barakzai brothers, who had supplanted the Durrani dynasty and become Emir (lord, chief or king) of Kabul in 1825, advanced up to Khaibar Pass threatening to recover Peshawar. In 1836, Hari Singh Nalwa, the Sikh general who along with Prince Nau Nihal Singh was guarding that frontier, built a chain of forts, including one at Jamrud at the eastern end of the Khyber Pass to defend the pass. Dost Muhammad erected a fort at `Ali Masjid at the other end. In the beginning of 1837, as Prince Nau Nihal Singh returned to Lahore to get married and the Maharaja and his court got busy with preparations for the wedding.

Dost Muhammad Khan sent a 25,000 strong force, including a large number of local irregulars and equipped with 18 heavy guns, to invest Jamrud. The Sikh garrison there had only 600 men and a few light artillery pieces. The Afghans besieged the fort and cut off its water supply, while a detachment was sent to the neighbouring Sikh fort of Shabqadar to prevent any help from that direction. Mahan Singh Mirpuri, the garrison commander of Jamrud, kept the invaders at bay for four days and managed meanwhile to send a desperate appeal for help to Hari Singh Nalva at Peshawar. Nalva rose from his sick bed and rushed to Jamrud.

In the final battle fought on 30 April 1837, the Afghans were driven off, but Hari Singh Nalva was killed. In 1838, with the help and agreement of the Sikh monarch who joined the Tripartite Treaty with British viceroy Lord Auckland, restored Shah Shuja to the Afghan throne in Kabul on 7 August 1839.
Dost Muhammad Khan was exiled to Mussoorie  in November 1839, but was restored to his former position after the murder of Shah Shuja in April 1842. He thereafter maintained cordial relations with the Lahore Darbar.

Second reign 
After the end of the First Anglo-Afghan War in 1842, Dost Mohammad Khan was now in a position to expand his state dramatically. This was in part due to the improving relationship between Dost Mohammad Khan and the British. During his exile in Calcutta, he was treated warmly.

He took note of the technological superiority of the British and was convinced that constant wars with them would damage Afghanistan. Instead, Dost Mohammad would advocate for an alliance with the British as the only way to ensure the survival of the state. With the First and Second Anglo-Sikh Wars eliminating any threat that the volatile Sikh Empire would have had on Afghanistan, Dost Mohammad Khan was now able to freely expand his kingdom with the help of the British, realizing that he and British had common Central Asian goals.

In 1843, Dost Mohammad Khan subdued the Hazarajat (Behsud, Dai Zangi, Dai Kundi) and Bamian, which had seized the power vacuum during the British invasion to become independent. In 1846, a rebellion by the Kohistani Tajiks of Tagab was suppressed and Dost Mohammad was able to consolidate his position on that traditionally rebellious area. In July 1848, he intended to send a force to conquer Balkh but the Second Anglo-Sikh War prevented this and occupied Dost Mohammad for another year. The Sikhs proposed to cede Peshawar to the Afghans (although it never became a reality) and as a result, Mohammad sent 5,000 Afghans under Mohammad Akram Khan to aid the Sikhs in the war. When the Sikhs were defeated and the British retook Peshawar, it was feared in Kabul that the British would follow up their victory by invading Afghanistan. However, this never happened and Dost Mohammad therefore sent his son, Mohammad Akram Khan, to invade Balkh in the Spring of 1849.

Conquest of the Balkh Wilayat 
The invasion of Balkh was successful and the province was annexed into Afghanistan. When Afzal Khan would take materials from the dilapidated city of Balkh and use it to construct a cantonment known as Takhtapul nearby, so that by 1854 Takhtapul was a fully grown city complete with gardens and courts. In 1850 Mohammad Akram Khan's half brother, Ghulam Haidar Khan, conquered Tashqurghan and the Mir Wali was forced to flee.

Alliance with the British 
On 30 March 1855, Dost Mohammad reversed his former policy by concluding an offensive and defensive alliance with the British government, signed by Sir Henry Lawrence, Chief Commissioner of the Punjab, first proposed by Herbert Edwardes. In November 1855, he conquered Kandahar. In 1857, he declared war on Persia in conjunction with the British, and in July, a treaty was concluded by which the province of Herat was placed under a Barakzai prince. During the Indian Rebellion of 1857, Dost Mohammad refrained from assisting the insurgents. His later years were disturbed by troubles at Herat and in Bukhara.

Conquest of Herat and Death 
In March 1862, Ahmad Khan, the ruler of Herat, captured Farah, which had been controlled by the Barakzai Emirs since 30 October 1856. This became Dost Mohammad Khan's cassus belli to launch an attack on Herat. On 29 June or 8 July, Farah was captured by the Muhammadzais. On 22 July, Sabzawar was captured. By 28 July, Herat was besieged. After a 10 month siege on 27 May 1863, he captured Herat, but on 9 June, he died suddenly in the midst of victory, after playing a great role in the history of South and Central Asia for forty years. He named his son, Sher Ali Khan, as his successor. He was buried in Herat at the Gazurgah. By the time of his death, the annual state revenue of his government had risen to 7 million rupees.

Gallery

See also
 List of leaders of Afghanistan

References

Sources 

 
 

 Vogelsang, Willem (2002) The Afghans, pp. 248–56. Blackwell Publishers. Oxford. .

 Shahamat Ali (1970) The Sikhs and Afghans. Patiala,
 Harlan, Josiah (1842) A Memoir of India and Afghanistan, London.
 Burnes, Alexander (1843) Cabool, London.
 Ganda Singh (1959) Ahmad Shah Durrani, Bombay.
 Sun, Sohan Lal (1885–89) `Umdat-ut-Twarikh Lahore, (Online copy)
 Braithwaite, Rodric (2012) Afgantsy, London.

External links 

 Afghan – Sikh Relations
 Anglo-Afghan Wars

1793 births
1863 deaths
19th-century Afghan monarchs
Emirs of Afghanistan
Barakzai dynasty
Pashtun people
People of the First Anglo-Afghan War
1820s in Afghanistan
1830s in Afghanistan
1840s in Afghanistan
19th-century Afghan politicians
19th-century monarchs in Asia